Tom Moffat (born 2 August 1987) is an Australian cricketer. He played in four first-class matches for South Australia in 2010 and 2011.

See also
 List of South Australian representative cricketers

References

External links
 

1987 births
Living people
Australian cricketers
South Australia cricketers
Cricketers from Adelaide